Shadi Kaur Dam (also "Shadikor") was a dam located on the Shadi Kaur river about  north of Pasni in Balochistan province of Pakistan. It was constructed in 2003 at a cost of 45 million Pakistani Rupees ($758,853) to provide irrigation for nearby farms.

On February 10, 2005, the dam burst due to heavy flooding caused by heavy rainfall, resulting in the deaths of about 70 villagers due to drowning and dragging their bodies into the Arabian Sea. Emergency search and rescue operations by the Pakistani military saved the lives of approximately 1,200 people.

See also
 List of dams and reservoirs in Pakistan

References

Notes

External links
PAKISTAN: Evacuations in Balochistan following dam breach
 Disease looms after Pakistan floods kill 350 (ChinaDaily, 14 February 2005)
 50 dead, 700 missing in flash flood in Pak (REDiff India Abroad, 11 February 2005)
 Shakidor Dam - before and after dam burst (UNITAR, 21 February 2005)

Dams in Balochistan, Pakistan
Dam failures in Asia
Dams completed in 2003
Former dams
Man-made disasters in Pakistan
2005 disasters in Pakistan